CI Capital Partners (formerly Caxton-Iseman Capital) is a private equity firm founded in 1993 by Frederick Iseman and based in New York City that specializes in middle market leveraged buyouts.  It is estimated that CI Capital Partners manages approximately $2 billion in assets.

History 
Frederick Iseman, CI Capital Partners’ chairman, formed the firm (then called Caxton-Iseman Capital) in 1993 with Caxton Associates, a New York investment management firm with $11 billion in assets under management.

On December 21, 2007, Caxton-Iseman Capital announced that it had completed its spin-off from Caxton Associates.  Caxton-Iseman Capital subsequently changed its name to CI Capital Partners LLC.

Notable Current & Prior Investments 
Buffets, Inc. - an operator of buffet style restaurants (Ryan's, HomeTown Buffet)
Anteon International Corporation - formerly listed ANT on the NYSE, an information technology company that was acquired by General Dynamics in 2006)

References

External links
CI Capital Partners

Financial services companies established in 1993
Private equity firms of the United States
Financial services companies based in New York (state)